Flat Earth is an archaic and scientifically disproven conception of the Earth's shape as a plane or disk. Many ancient cultures subscribed to a flat-Earth cosmography.

The idea of a spherical Earth appeared in ancient Greek philosophy with Pythagoras (6th century BC). However, most pre-Socratics (6th–5th century BC) retained the flat-Earth model. In the early 4th century BC, Plato wrote about a spherical Earth. By about 330 BC, his former student Aristotle had provided strong empirical evidence for a spherical Earth. Knowledge of the Earth's global shape gradually began to spread beyond the Hellenistic world. By the early period of the Christian Church, the spherical view was widely held, with some notable exceptions.

It is a historical myth that medieval Europeans generally thought the Earth was flat. This myth was created in the 17th century by Protestants to argue against Catholic teachings. Despite the scientific fact and obvious effects of Earth's sphericity, pseudoscientific flat-Earth conspiracy theories are espoused by modern flat Earth societies and, increasingly, by unaffiliated individuals using social media.

History

Belief in flat Earth

West Asia

In early Egyptian and Mesopotamian thought, the world was portrayed as a disk floating in the ocean. A similar model is found in the Homeric account from the 8th century BC in which "Okeanos, the personified body of water surrounding the circular surface of the Earth, is the begetter of all life and possibly of all gods."

The Pyramid Texts and Coffin Texts of ancient Egypt show a similar cosmography; Nun (the Ocean) encircled nbwt ("dry lands" or "Islands").

The Israelites also imagined the Earth to be a disc floating on water with an arched firmament above it that separated the Earth from the heavens. The sky was a solid dome with the Sun, Moon, planets, and stars embedded in it.

Greece

Poets
Both Homer and Hesiod described a disc cosmography on the Shield of Achilles.
This poetic tradition of an Earth-encircling (gaiaokhos) sea (Oceanus) and a disc also appears in Stasinus of Cyprus, Mimnermus, Aeschylus, and Apollonius Rhodius.

Homer's description of the disc cosmography on the shield of Achilles with the encircling ocean is repeated far later in Quintus Smyrnaeus' Posthomerica (4th century AD), which continues the narration of the Trojan War.

Philosophers

Several pre-Socratic philosophers believed that the world was flat: Thales (c. 550 BC) according to several sources, and Leucippus (c. 440 BC) and Democritus (c. 460–370 BC) according to Aristotle.

Thales thought that the Earth floated in water like a log. It has been argued, however, that Thales actually believed in a round Earth. Anaximander (c. 550 BC) believed that the Earth was a short cylinder with a flat, circular top that remained stable because it was the same distance from all things. Anaximenes of Miletus believed that "the Earth is flat and rides on air; in the same way the Sun and the Moon and the other heavenly bodies, which are all fiery, ride the air because of their flatness". Xenophanes of Colophon (c. 500 BC) thought that the Earth was flat, with its upper side touching the air, and the lower side extending without limit.

Belief in a flat Earth continued into the 5th century BC. Anaxagoras (c. 450 BC) agreed that the Earth was flat, and his pupil Archelaus believed that the flat Earth was depressed in the middle like a saucer, to allow for the fact that the Sun does not rise and set at the same time for everyone.

Historians
Hecataeus of Miletus believed that the Earth was flat and surrounded by water. Herodotus in his Histories ridiculed the belief that water encircled the world, yet most classicists agree that he still believed Earth was flat because of his descriptions of literal "ends" or "edges" of the Earth.

Northern Europe
The ancient Norse and Germanic peoples believed in a flat-Earth cosmography with the Earth surrounded by an ocean, with the axis mundi, a world tree (Yggdrasil), or pillar (Irminsul) in the centre. In the world-encircling ocean sat a snake called Jormungandr. The Norse creation account preserved in Gylfaginning (VIII) states that during the creation of the Earth, an impassable sea was placed around it:

The late Norse Konungs skuggsjá, on the other hand, explains Earth's shape as a sphere:

East Asia

In ancient China, the prevailing belief was that the Earth was flat and square, while the heavens were round, an assumption virtually unquestioned until the introduction of European astronomy in the 17th century. The English sinologist Cullen emphasizes the point that there was no concept of a round Earth in ancient Chinese astronomy:

The model of an egg was often used by Chinese astronomers such as Zhang Heng (78–139 AD) to describe the heavens as spherical:

This analogy with a curved egg led some modern historians, notably Joseph Needham, to conjecture that Chinese astronomers were, after all, aware of the Earth's sphericity. The egg reference, however, was rather meant to clarify the relative position of the flat Earth to the heavens:

Further examples cited by Needham supposed to demonstrate dissenting voices from the ancient Chinese consensus actually refer without exception to the Earth being square, not to it being flat. Accordingly, the 13th-century scholar Li Ye, who argued that the movements of the round heaven would be hindered by a square Earth, did not advocate a spherical Earth, but rather that its edge should be rounded off so as to be circular. However, Needham disagrees, affirming that Li Ye believed the Earth to be spherical, similar in shape to the heavens but much smaller. This was preconceived by the 4th-century scholar Yu Xi, who argued for the infinity of outer space surrounding the Earth and that the latter could be either square or round, in accordance to the shape of the heavens. When Chinese geographers of the 17th century, influenced by European cartography and astronomy, showed the Earth as a sphere that could be circumnavigated by sailing around the globe, they did so with formulaic terminology previously used by Zhang Heng to describe the spherical shape of the Sun and Moon (i.e. that they were as round as a crossbow bullet).

As noted in the book Huainanzi, in the 2nd century BC, Chinese astronomers effectively inverted Eratosthenes' calculation of the curvature of the Earth to calculate the height of the Sun above the Earth. The Zhoubi Suanjing also discusses how to determine the distance of the Sun by measuring the length of noontime shadows at different latitudes, a method similar to Eratosthenes' measurement of the circumference of the Earth, but the Zhoubi Suanjing assumes that the Earth is flat.

Alternate or mixed theories

Greece: spherical Earth

Pythagoras in the 6th century BC and Parmenides in the 5th century stated that the Earth is spherical, and this view spread rapidly in the Greek world. Around 330 BC, Aristotle maintained on the basis of physical theory and observational evidence that the Earth was spherical, and reported an estimate of its circumference. The Earth's circumference was first determined around 240 BC by Eratosthenes. By the 2nd century AD, Ptolemy had derived his maps from a globe and developed the system of latitude, longitude, and climes. His Almagest was written in Greek and only translated into Latin in the 11th century from Arabic translations.

Lucretius (1st century BC) opposed the concept of a spherical Earth, because he considered that an infinite universe had no center towards which heavy bodies would tend. Thus, he thought the idea of animals walking around topsy-turvy under the Earth was absurd. By the 1st century AD, Pliny the Elder was in a position to claim that everyone agreed on the spherical shape of Earth, though disputes continued regarding the nature of the antipodes, and how it is possible to keep the ocean in a curved shape.

South Asia

The Vedic texts depict the cosmos in many ways. One of the earliest Indian cosmological texts picture the Earth as one of a stack of flat disks.

In the Vedic texts, Dyaus (heaven) and Prithvi (Earth) are compared to wheels on an axle, yielding a flat model. They are also described as bowls or leather bags, yielding a concave model. According to Macdonell: "the conception of the Earth being a disc surrounded by an ocean does not appear in the Samhitas. But it was naturally regarded as circular, being compared with a wheel (10.89) and expressly called circular (parimandala) in the Shatapatha Brahmana."

By about the 5th century AD, the siddhanta astronomy texts of South Asia, particularly of Aryabhata, assume a spherical Earth as they develop mathematical methods for quantitative astronomy for calendar and time keeping.

The medieval Indian texts called the Puranas describe the Earth as a flat-bottomed, circular disk with concentric oceans and continents. This general scheme is present not only in the Hindu cosmologies, but also in Buddhist and Jain cosmologies of South Asia. However, some Puranas include other models. The fifth canto of the Bhagavata Purana, for example, includes sections that describe the Earth both as flat and spherical.

Early Christian Church
During the early period of the Christian Church, the spherical view continued to be widely held, with some notable exceptions.
Athenagoras, an eastern Christian writing around the year 175 AD, said that the Earth was spherical. Methodius (c. 290 AD), an eastern Christian writing against "the theory of the Chaldeans and the Egyptians" said: "Let us first lay bare ... the theory of the Chaldeans and the Egyptians. They say that the circumference of the universe is likened to the turnings of a well-rounded globe, the Earth being a central point. They say that since its outline is spherical, ... the Earth should be the center of the universe, around which the heaven is whirling." Lactantius, a western Christian writer and advisor to the first Christian Roman Emperor, Constantine, writing sometime between 304 and 313 AD, ridiculed the notion of antipodes and the philosophers who fancied that "the universe is round like a ball. They also thought that heaven revolves in accordance with the motion of the heavenly bodies. ... For that reason, they constructed brass globes, as though after the figure of the universe." Arnobius, another eastern Christian writing sometime around 305 AD, described the round Earth: "In the first place, indeed, the world itself is neither right nor left. It has neither upper nor lower regions, nor front nor back. For whatever is round and bounded on every side by the circumference of a solid sphere, has no beginning or end ..."

The influential theologian and philosopher Saint Augustine, one of the four Great Church Fathers of the Western Church, similarly objected to the "fable" of antipodes:

Some historians do not view Augustine's scriptural commentaries as endorsing any particular cosmological model, endorsing instead the view that Augustine shared the common view of his contemporaries that the Earth is spherical, in line with his endorsement of science in De Genesi ad litteram. C. P. E. Nothaft, responding to writers like Leo Ferrari who described Augustine as endorsing a flat earth, says that "...other recent writers on the subject treat Augustine’s acceptance of the earth’s spherical shape as a well-established fact".

Diodorus of Tarsus, a leading figure in the School of Antioch and mentor of John Chrysostom, may have argued for a flat Earth; however, Diodorus' opinion on the matter is known only from a later criticism. Chrysostom, one of the four Great Church Fathers of the Eastern Church and Archbishop of Constantinople, explicitly espoused the idea, based on scripture, that the Earth floats miraculously on the water beneath the firmament. Athanasius the Great, Church Father and Patriarch of Alexandria, expressed a similar view in Against the Heathen.

Christian Topography (547) by the Alexandrian monk Cosmas Indicopleustes, who had traveled as far as Sri Lanka and the source of the Blue Nile, is now widely considered the most valuable geographical document of the early medieval age, although it received relatively little attention from contemporaries. In it, the author repeatedly expounds the doctrine that the universe consists of only two places, the Earth below the firmament and heaven above it. Carefully drawing on arguments from scripture, he describes the Earth as a rectangle, 400 days' journey long by 200 wide, surrounded by four oceans and enclosed by four massive walls which support the firmament. The spherical Earth theory is contemptuously dismissed as "pagan".

Severian, Bishop of Gabala ( 408), wrote that the Earth is flat and the Sun does not pass under it in the night, but "travels through the northern parts as if hidden by a wall". Basil of Caesarea (329–379) argued that the matter was theologically irrelevant.

Europe: Early Middle Ages
Early medieval Christian writers in the early Middle Ages felt little urge to assume flatness of the Earth, though they had fuzzy impressions of the writings of Ptolemy and Aristotle, relying more on Pliny.

With the end of the Western Roman Empire, Western Europe entered the Middle Ages with great difficulties that affected the continent's intellectual production. Most scientific treatises of classical antiquity (in Greek) were unavailable, leaving only simplified summaries and compilations. In contrast, the Eastern Roman Empire did not fall, and it preserved the learning. Still, many textbooks of the Early Middle Ages supported the sphericity of the Earth in the western part of Europe.

Europe's view of the shape of the Earth in Late Antiquity and the Early Middle Ages may be best expressed by the writings of early Christian scholars:

Bishop Isidore of Seville (560–636) taught in his widely read encyclopedia, the Etymologies, diverse views such as that the Earth "resembles a wheel" resembling Anaximander in language and the map that he provided. This was widely interpreted as referring to a disc-shaped Earth. An illustration from Isidore's De Natura Rerum shows the five zones of the Earth as adjacent circles. Some have concluded that he thought the Arctic and Antarctic zones were adjacent to each other. He did not admit the possibility of antipodes, which he took to mean people dwelling on the opposite side of the Earth, considering them legendary and noting that there was no evidence for their existence. Isidore's T and O map, which was seen as representing a small part of a spherical Earth, continued to be used by authors through the Middle Ages, e.g. the 9th-century bishop Rabanus Maurus, who compared the habitable part of the northern hemisphere (Aristotle's northern temperate clime) with a wheel. At the same time, Isidore's works also gave the views of sphericity, for example, in chapter 28 of De Natura Rerum, Isidore claims that the Sun orbits the Earth and illuminates the other side when it is night on this side. See French translation of De Natura Rerum. In his other work Etymologies, there are also affirmations that the sphere of the sky has Earth in its center and the sky being equally distant on all sides. Other researchers have argued these points as well. "The work remained unsurpassed until the thirteenth century and was regarded as the summit of all knowledge. It became an essential part of European medieval culture. Soon after the invention of typography it appeared many times in print." However, "The Scholastics – later medieval philosophers, theologians, and scientists – were helped by the Arabic translators and commentaries, but they hardly needed to struggle against a flat-Earth legacy from the early middle ages (500–1050). Early medieval writers often had fuzzy and imprecise impressions of both Ptolemy and Aristotle and relied more on Pliny, but they felt (with one exception), little urge to assume flatness."

St Vergilius of Salzburg (c. 700–784), in the middle of the 8th century, discussed or taught some geographical or cosmographical ideas that St Boniface found sufficiently objectionable that he complained about them to Pope Zachary. The only surviving record of the incident is contained in Zachary's reply, dated 748, where he wrote:

Some authorities have suggested that the sphericity of the Earth was among the aspects of Vergilius's teachings that Boniface and Zachary considered objectionable. Others have considered this unlikely, and take the wording of Zachary's response to indicate at most an objection to belief in the existence of humans living in the antipodes. In any case, there is no record of any further action having been taken against Vergilius. He was later appointed bishop of Salzburg and was canonised in the 13th century.

A possible non-literary but graphic indication that people in the Middle Ages believed that the Earth (or perhaps the world) was a sphere is the use of the orb (globus cruciger) in the regalia of many kingdoms and of the Holy Roman Empire. It is attested from the time of the Christian late-Roman emperor Theodosius II (423) throughout the Middle Ages; the Reichsapfel was used in 1191 at the coronation of emperor Henry VI. However the word  means "circle", and there is no record of a globe as a representation of the Earth since ancient times in the west until that of Martin Behaim in 1492. Additionally it could well be a representation of the entire "world" or cosmos.

A recent study of medieval concepts of the sphericity of the Earth noted that "since the eighth century, no cosmographer worthy of note has called into question the sphericity of the Earth". However, the work of these intellectuals may not have had significant influence on public opinion, and it is difficult to tell what the wider population may have thought of the shape of the Earth if they considered the question at all.

Europe: Late Middle Ages

Hermannus Contractus (1013–1054) was among the earliest Christian scholars to estimate the circumference of Earth with Eratosthenes' method. St. Thomas Aquinas (1225–1274), the most widely taught theologian of the Middle Ages, believed in a spherical Earth and took for granted that his readers also knew the Earth is round. Lectures in the medieval universities commonly advanced evidence in favor of the idea that the Earth was a sphere.

Jill Tattersall shows that in many vernacular works in 12th- and 13th-century French texts the Earth was considered "round like a table" rather than "round like an apple". "In virtually all the examples quoted ... from epics and from non-'historical' romances (that is, works of a less learned character) the actual form of words used suggests strongly a circle rather than a sphere", though she notes that even in these works the language is ambiguous.

Portuguese navigation down and around the coast of Africa in the latter half of the 1400s gave wide-scale observational evidence for Earth's sphericity. In these explorations, the Sun position moved more northward the further south the explorers travelled. Its position directly overhead at noon gave evidence for crossing the equator. These apparent solar motions in detail were more consistent with north–south curvature and a distant Sun, than with any flat-Earth explanation. The ultimate demonstration came when Ferdinand Magellan's expedition completed the first global circumnavigation in 1521. Antonio Pigafetta, one of the few survivors of the voyage, recorded the loss of a day in the course of the voyage, giving evidence for east–west curvature.

Middle East: Islamic scholars

The Abbasid Caliphate saw a great flowering of astronomy and mathematics in the 9th century AD. Muslim scholars of the past believed in a spherical Earth.

The Quran mentions that the Earth (al-arḍ) was "spread out". Prior to the introduction of Greek cosmology into the Islamic world, early Muslims tended to also view the Earth as flat, and Muslim traditionalists who rejected Greek philosophy continued to hold to this view later on while various theologians held different opinions. For example, a tafsir on Qur'an 13:3 saying that God stretched out the Earth was commented on by Al-Mawardi as being written "in response to those who claim that it is round like a ball". The same argument against a spherical Earth was made in a tafsir by Al-Qurtubi in the 13th century. which he said was the opinion of the scholars of the law.

Beginning in the 10th century onwards, some Muslim traditionalists began to adopt the notion of a spherical Earth. For example, regarding the Qur'anic statements about the Earth spreading, the 12th-century commentary, the Tafsir al-Kabir (al-Razi) by Fakhr al-Din al-Razi states: "If it is said: Do the words 'And the Earth We spread out' indicate that it is flat? We would respond: Yes, because the Earth, even though it is round, is an enormous sphere, and each little part of this enormous sphere, when it is looked at, appears to be flat. As that is the case, this will dispel what they mentioned of confusion. The evidence for that is the verse in which Allah says (interpretation of the meaning): 'And the mountains as pegs' [an-Naba' 78:7]. He called them awtaad (pegs) even though these mountains may have large flat surfaces. And the same is true in this case." In the 11th century, Ibn Hazm claimed that "Evidence shows that the Earth is a sphere but public people say the opposite." He added: "None of those who deserve being Imams for Muslims has denied that Earth is round. And we have not received anything indicates a denial, not even a single word."

Ming Dynasty in China
A spherical terrestrial globe was introduced to Yuan-era Khanbaliq (i.e. Beijing) in 1267 by the Persian astronomer Jamal ad-Din, but it is not known to have made an impact on the traditional Chinese conception of the shape of the Earth. As late as 1595, an early Jesuit missionary to China, Matteo Ricci, recorded that the Ming-dynasty Chinese say: "The Earth is flat and square, and the sky is a round canopy; they did not succeed in conceiving the possibility of the antipodes."

In the 17th century, the idea of a spherical Earth spread in China due to the influence of the Jesuits, who held high positions as astronomers at the imperial court. Matteo Ricci, in collaboration with Chinese cartographers and translator Li Zhizao, published the Kunyu Wanguo Quantu in 1602, the first Chinese world map based on European discoveries. The astronomical and geographical treatise Gezhicao written in 1648 by Xiong Mingyu explained that the Earth was spherical, not flat or square, and could be circumnavigated.

Myth of flat-Earth prevalence 

In the 19th century, a historical myth arose which held that the predominant cosmological doctrine during the Middle Ages was that the Earth was flat. An early proponent of this myth was the American writer Washington Irving, who maintained that Christopher Columbus had to overcome the opposition of churchmen to gain sponsorship for his voyage of exploration. Later significant advocates of this view were John William Draper and Andrew Dickson White, who used it as a major element in their advocacy of the thesis that there was a long-lasting and essential conflict between science and religion. Some studies of the historical connections between science and religion have demonstrated that theories of their mutual antagonism ignore examples of their mutual support.

Subsequent studies of medieval science have shown that most scholars in the Middle Ages, including those read by Christopher Columbus, maintained that the Earth was spherical.

Modern flat Earth beliefs

In the modern era, the pseudoscientific belief in a flat Earth originated with the English writer Samuel Rowbotham with the 1849 pamphlet Zetetic Astronomy. Lady Elizabeth Blount established the Universal Zetetic Society in 1893, which published journals. In 1956, Samuel Shenton set up the International Flat Earth Research Society, better known as the "Flat Earth Society" from Dover, England, as a direct descendant of the Universal Zetetic Society.

In the Internet era, the availability of communications technology and social media like YouTube, Facebook and Twitter have made it easy for individuals, famous or not, to spread disinformation and attract others to erroneous ideas, including that of the flat Earth.

To maintain belief in the face of overwhelming contrary, publicly available empirical evidence accumulated in the Space Age, modern believers must generally embrace some form of conspiracy theory out of the necessity of explaining why major institutions such as governments, media outlets, schools, scientists, and airlines all assert that the world is a sphere. They tend to not trust observations they have not made themselves, and often distrust or disagree with each other.

Cultural references
The term flat-earth-man, used in a derogatory sense to mean anyone who holds ridiculously antiquated or impossible views, predates the more compact flat-earther.  It was recorded in 1908: "Fewer votes than one would have thought possible for any human candidate, were he even a flat-earth-man." According to the Oxford English Dictionary, the first use of the term flat-Earther was in 1934 in Punch magazine: "Without being a bigoted flat-earther, [Mercator] perceived the nuisance ... of fiddling about with globes ... in order to discover the South Seas."

Education 
For young children who have not yet received information from their social environment, their own perception of their surroundings often leads to a false concept about the shape of the underground on the horizon. Many children think that the earth ends there and that one can fall off the edge. The education they receive helps them to gradually change their false concept into a realist one of a spherical earth.

See also

 Alderson disk
 Denialism
 Earth's rotation
 Geocentric model
 Geographical distance
 Hollow Earth
 Pseudoscience
 Scientific myth
 Scientific skepticism
 World Turtle

References

Bibliography

Further reading
 Fraser, Raymond (2007). When The Earth Was Flat: Remembering Leonard Cohen, Alden Nowlan, the Flat Earth Society, the King James monarchy hoax, the Montreal Story Tellers and other curious matters. Black Moss Press,

External links

 
 
 
  – Review of a pro-Flat Earth documentary.
 The Myth of the Flat Earth
 The Myth of the Flat Universe
 You say the earth is round? Prove it (from The Straight Dope)
 Flat Earth Fallacy 
 Zetetic Astronomy, or Earth Not a Globe by Parallax (Samuel Birley Rowbotham (1816–1884)) at sacred-texts.com
 Flat Earth idea of the suns trajectory
 Flat Earth Theory of the Moon & Sun's paths around the world

 
Early scientific cosmologies